Asing is a surname. Notable people with the surname include:

Kaipo Asing (born 1930 or 1931), American politician
Keanu Asing (born 1993), American surfer